The Solvang Vintage Motorcycle Museum is a 'Collector's Collection' museum in Solvang, California, United States. The museum was founded in March 2000 by Virgil Elings, a local retiree and a collector of motorcycles.

The museum's collection includes a Britten V1000, a supercharged version of a Vincent Black Lightning, and a rare Vincent Grey Flash, one of four Isle of Man TT racing specials.

References

External links
 

Motorcycle museums in the United States
Transportation museums in California
Museums in Santa Barbara County, California
Solvang, California